During the 2001–02 English football season, Brentford competed in the Football League Second Division. The Bees were denied promotion after defeat to Stoke City in the 2002 Second Division playoff Final.

Season summary

After a promising, but ultimately disappointing 2000–01 season, Steve Coppell replaced Ray Lewington as manager of Second Division Brentford on 8 May 2001. In the knowledge he would be provided with little money to buy players, Coppell was also tasked with raising £500,000 in transfer fees. The previous season's squad was kept together, with two fringe players released and two arrivals – youngster Stephen Hunt and defender Jason Price on a short-term contract. After a 1–1 opening day draw with Wigan Athletic, teenage Blackburn Rovers forward Ben Burgess was brought in on a one-month loan, which was subsequently extended until the end of the season.

Brentford had its best start to a season since 1934–35 and topped the table for the first time after a 4–0 win over Tranmere Rovers on 8 September 2001. After a first league defeat of the season at the hands of Swindon Town on 25 September, the Bees went on a seven-match club record-equalling winning run and seized top spot in the Second Division. Captain Paul Evans led by example, scoring 9 goals in 13 matches in all competitions before suffering a hamstring injury in mid-October. His temporary replacement was Arsenal's teenage midfielder Steve Sidwell, another loan signing which would prove to be a master-stroke and which would later be extended until the end of the season. Between 10 November 2001 and 24 January 2002, Brentford won just twice in a spell of 13 league matches, suffering eight defeats, while briefly returning to the top of the table in late December. By 21 December, Lloyd Owusu, Paul Evans and Ben Burgess had each reached 10 or more goals for the season, which was the fourth instance of three Brentford players reaching double-figures before Christmas Day.

A 4–0 victory over Brighton & Hove Albion in front of the Sky cameras at Griffin Park on 24 January 2002 turned Brentford's flagging season around, with twin forwards Owusu and Burgess finding the net with regularity. The Bees lost just two of the next 16 matches, but a 0–0 draw away to West London rivals Queens Park Rangers in the penultimate match of the season dropped the club out of the final automatic promotion place. Cause for concern was a goal drought suffered by Ben Burgess, who had failed to score since 26 February and the midfield was weakened by the £150,000 sale of Gavin Mahon to Watford, in a bid to reduce the wage bill. Brentford would play 2nd-place Reading at Griffin Park on the final day of the season, needing a win to secure automatic promotion, while the Royals only needed a draw. Brentford took the lead through Martin Rowlands, but were pegged back 13 minutes from time by Jamie Cureton and the match finished as a 1–1 draw, which consigned the Bees to the playoffs.

Brentford faced 6th-placed Huddersfield Town in the playoff semi-finals, a rematch of the 1995 semi-final encounter between the two sides. The Bees held the Terriers to a 0–0 draw at the McAlpine Stadium and reached the 2002 Second Division playoff Final courtesy of goals from Darren Powell and Lloyd Owusu to emerge 2–1 victors in the second leg. In the final versus Stoke City, Brentford "simply had no sting in their tail" and were defeated 2–0.

League table

Results
Brentford's goal tally listed first.

Legend

Pre-season

Football League Second Division

Football League Second Division play-offs

FA Cup

Football League Cup

Football League Trophy

 Sources: Soccerbase, 11v11

Playing squad 
Players' ages are as of the opening day of the 2001–02 season.

 Source: Soccerbase

Coaching staff

Statistics

Appearances and goals
Substitute appearances in brackets.

 Players listed in italics left the club mid-season.
 Source: Soccerbase

Goalscorers 

 Players listed in italics left the club mid-season.
 Source: Soccerbase

Discipline

 Players listed in italics left the club mid-season.
 Source: ESPN FC

International caps

Management

Summary

Transfers & loans

Kit

|
|

Awards 
 Supporters' Player of the Year: Ívar Ingimarsson
 Football League Second Division Manager of the Month: Steve Coppell (October 2001)
 Football League Second Division PFA Team of the Year: Paul Evans
 Football League Second Division Team of the Year: Paul Evans, Lloyd Owusu
 Football League Goal of the Month: Lloyd Owusu (March 2002)
 Hounslow Chronicle Player of the Month: Lloyd Owusu (December 2001)

Notes

References

Brentford F.C. seasons
Brentford